Edward Bertie "Ed" Horler (born 22 September 1995) is an English field hockey player who plays as a forward for Wimbledon.

Club career
Horler, educated at Millfield, started playing for Team Bath Buccaneers and represented England U-18s and U-21s. He has also played for Loughborough Students. He played club hockey in the Men's England Hockey League Premier Division for Wimbledon from 2017. He left England in July 2020 to play for Racing Club de Bruxelles in Belgium.

References

External links

1995 births
Living people
English male field hockey players
Wimbledon Hockey Club players
Men's England Hockey League players
Team Bath Buccaneers Hockey Club players
Loughborough Students field hockey players
Place of birth missing (living people)
Male field hockey forwards
Men's Belgian Hockey League players
Royal Racing Club Bruxelles players